Sholokhovsky (masculine), Sholokhovskaya (feminine), or Sholokhovskoye (neuter) may refer to:
Sholokhovsky District, a district of Rostov Oblast, Russia
Sholokhovsky (urban-type settlement), an urban locality (a work settlement) in Rostov Oblast, Russia